Conlan is a surname of Irish origin, meaning hero. In its original Gaelic form it was spelt a number of different ways, resulting in many English-language versions, such as Conlon, Connellan, etc.

The O'Connellans were chiefs of Crioch Tullach, in County Tyrone. O'Conalláin (O'Connellan or O'Kendellan) were princes of Ui Laeghari or "Ive-Leary" in the tenth and eleventh centuries, an extensive territory in the counties of Meath and Westmeath (O'Coindealbhain, O'Connialláin, O'Connolláin, O'Connellan). Branches of this family in the twelfth and thirteenth centuries settled in the counties of Roscommon, Galway and Mayo.

Notable people with the surname include:

Bernard Conlan (1923–2013), British Labour Party politician
Craig Conlan, Scottish comics writer and artist
Dennis Conlan (1838–1870), American Civil War soldier
Greg Conlan (born 1963), Australian football player
Jason Conlan (born 1971), New Zealand cartoonist
Jocko Conlan (1899–1989), American baseball umpire
John Bertrand Conlan (1930–2021), American lawyer and Republican politician, son of Jocko
John Conlan (Kildare politician), Irish politician and farmer
John Conlan (Monaghan politician) (1928–2004), Irish Fine Gael politician, grocer and publican
Joseph Conlan, American film score composer
Martin E. Conlan (1849–1923), American politician from South Dakota
Matthew Conlan (hurler) (born 1993) Irish hurler
Matt Conlan, Australian politician
Michael Conlan (boxer) (born 1991), Irish boxer
Michael Conlan (footballer) (born 1958), Australian football player, son of Neil
Neil Conlan (1936–1978), Australian football player
Shane Conlan (born 1964), American football player
Paul Conlan (born 1970), Scottish bowls international and Scottish Singles Champion.

Fictional characters:
Molly Conlan McKinnon, character from the CBS Soap As The World Turns
"Pretty" Ricky Conlan is a light heavyweight boxer from Liverpool, England, and the main antagonist in Creed

See also
 Connellan
 Conlon

References

Surnames of Irish origin